The 1971 U.S. Women's Open was the 26th U.S. Women's Open, held June 24–27 at Kahkwa Club in Erie, Pennsylvania.

JoAnne Carner won the first of her two U.S. Women's Open titles, seven strokes ahead of runner-up Kathy Whitworth. Carner led (or co-led) wire-to-wire and entered the final round with a five-stroke lead over 1963 champion Mary Mills. The course was designed by Donald Ross.

Past champions in the field

Source:

Final leaderboard
Sunday, June 27, 1971

Source:

References

External links
Golf Observer final leaderboard
U.S. Women's Open – past champions – 1971
Kahkwa Club

U.S. Women's Open
Golf in Pennsylvania
Sports competitions in Pennsylvania
Erie, Pennsylvania
Women's sports in Pennsylvania
U.S. Women's Open
U.S. Women's Open
U.S. Women's Open
U.S. Women's Open